"Old Yeller-Belly" is the nineteenth episode of the fourteenth season of the American television series The Simpsons. It originally aired on the Fox network in the United States on May 4, 2003. Santa's Little Helper fails to help Homer when he is trapped in a fire. He is rebuffed by the family, but eventually accepted again.

Plot
Bart and his friends in his treehouse try to eavesdrop on Lisa and her friends having a tea party, and the treehouse gets destroyed in the ensuing fight. The Amish build a grand new one but, ignorant of electricity, install the wiring wrongly. There is a fire at the party to mark the completion of the treehouse. Everyone gets out safely except Homer. Santa's Little Helper is there, but does not even try to save him. Snowball II climbs up to save him, scratching him hard to restore him to consciousness.

Homer becomes very fond and appreciative of Snowball II and very cold towards Santa's Little Helper, whom he labels a coward for leaving him for dead. The dog follows him everywhere trying to regain his acceptance, but Homer rebuffs him. Snowball II is a local hero. The local dog park is renamed the "Snowball II Municipal Cat Park". In an interview with Kent Brockman, Homer declares, "I have no dog!"

Santa's Little Helper is tethered in the backyard. There is an empty beer can there. Santa's Little Helper flips the can into the air, balancing it on his nose and drinking the last few drops. A Springfield Shopper reporter sees this and takes a photo, which appears on the front page of the newspaper. This gets the attention of Duff Beer, who announce that Duffman will be replaced with Santa's Little Helper, as their new mascot, Suds McDuff.

Suds McDuff boosts sales of Duff Beer and the family's fortunes explode. However, this prompts Santa's Little Helper's original sleazy owner and racing trainer (from "Simpsons Roasting on an Open Fire") to visit the Simpsons and prove that he owns the dog by showing the interview footage of Homer disowning him. He becomes Suds' owner again and takes the earnings for himself.

The family manage to find Duffman, figuring that if they can get him to replace Suds as the Duff mascot, they can get their dog back. He is eager to join their scheme: he will help them get Santa's Little Helper back at a Duff Beer-sponsored beach volleyball event.

At the event, Homer pretends to be drowning, while he is actually floating on a keg of beer. As Homer expected, Santa's Little Helper is not brave enough to save him. However, when Duffman is called to save Homer, a shark is seen and Duffman refuses to go in. The shark tries to bite Homer, but bites the beer keg open instead and gets drunk. The crowd at the beach likes the shark, and Duff Beer announces that the shark — named Duff McShark — will be their new mascot. Santa's Little Helper returns to the Simpson family.

Cultural references
Yellow belly is an abusive term for a coward.

The episode title is a reference to the 1957 Disney live-action feature Old Yeller. Santa's Little Helper's alter ego as Suds McDuff is a reference to the old Bud Light mascot Spuds McKenzie.

External links

The Simpsons (season 14) episodes
2003 American television episodes
Television episodes about mammals